Wiedingen is a village in the borough of Soltau in the district of Soltau-Fallingbostel in the German state of Lower Saxony. The village has 142 inhabitants (as at: 2003). The hamlets of Ellingen and Wieheholz belong to the municipality of Wiedingen.

Location 
Wiedingen lies on the Lüneburg Heath northwest of Soltau on the River Soltau. 
The B 71 federal highway and the Soltau–Neuenkirchen railway run through Wiedingen.

History 
The Battle of Soltau, the last known cavalry battle, took place on 28 June 1519 near Wiedingen.
In Wiedingen is an old defensive wall (landwehr) known as the Wall to dem Wieholte.
The Low Saxon name is Wiegen.

Current
The television series Die Kinder vom Alstertal was shot, from the third episode, on the Menkenhof in Wiedingen.
 The chair of the parish council is Wilhelm Cassebaum (as at 2008).

Gallery

External links

References 

Villages in Lower Saxony
Soltau
Heidmark